Doncaster Archives holds the archives for the district of Doncaster. The archives are held at King Edward Road, Balby, Doncaster and run by the Metropolitan Borough of Doncaster.

References

County record offices in England
Doncaster
History of Yorkshire